Timothy S. McCune (born March 30, 1963) is an American businessman and former journalist known primarily as former president of Integrated Wave Technologies, Inc., and current president of Linear Integrated Systems, Inc.

McCune in 2004 became president of Integrated Wave Technologies, Inc., a company founded in 1992 to combine the talents of Silicon Valley pioneer John H. Hall with former Soviet scientists who had worked with speech recognition.

McCune traveled extensively in Iraq and Afghanistan to complete testing and development of IWT’s flagship product, the Voice Response Translator (VRT).

In 2008, Inc Magazine named IWT the 200th Fastest Growing Company in the US.

In 2010, McCune was named as sole inventor in a patent related to IWT’s work for DARPA, US Patent 7,707,035.

DARPA subsequently awarded IWT with a contract for the purchase of 2,000 licenses for the digital version of the highly successful VRT application for Android systems.
 
In 2014, McCune was named president of Linear Integrated Systems, Inc., after the death of company founder John H. Hall. He is a member of the board of directors of Linear Integrated Systems and remains on the board of IWT.

McCune published in December, 2017 a novel based on his travels to Afghanistan and Russia entitled, “Last Call in Kabul.”  The book peaked at No.1 on Kindle in the Russian Fiction subcategory and No. 8 in the War Fiction subcategory.

References

1963 births
Living people
21st-century American businesspeople
21st-century American inventors